This is a list of national capitals, ordered according to total area. Capitals of dependent territories and disputed territories are marked in italics. The area of the capital city only includes the area occupied by the city and not the wider urban/metropolitan district or administrative division created solely for the city.

List

References

See more 

 List of national capitals by population
 Capital (political)
 List of national capitals
 List of countries and dependencies by area

Lists of capitals